The Passo Fedaia is a mountain pass traversed by a paved road in the Dolomiti Range in Northern Italy. It lies at the northern base of the Marmolada, the highest peak in the region and the Dolomiti. It is known for its beauty, for Lago Fedaia, and for its use in the Giro d'Italia. It was also used as a location for the 2003 film Italian Job. It is the site of the Passo Fedaia and Marmolada Gletscher ski areas.

See also
 List of highest paved roads in Europe
 List of mountain passes

References

External links 
Passo Fedaia from Caprile by cyclingdolomites.com

 
 

Mountain passes of Trentino-South Tyrol
Fedaia
Marmolada